The men's C-2 1000 metres event was an open-style, pairs canoeing event conducted as part of the Canoeing at the 1960 Summer Olympics program on Lake Albano.

Medalists

Results

Heats
Eleven teams first raced in two heats on August 26. The top three finishers from each heat advanced directly to the final and the remaining five teams were relegated to the repechage.

Repechage
The top three finishers in the repechage (raced on August 27) advanced to the final while the rest were eliminated.

The American team was disqualified for reasons not disclosed in the official report.

Final
The final was held on August 29.

Bulgaria's time was not listed in the official report, but was found in Wallechinsky and Loucky's reference shown below.

References
1960 Summer Olympics official report Volume 2, Part 1. pp. 257–9.
Sports-reference.com 1960 C-2 1000 m results.
Wallechinsky, David and Jaime Loucky (2008). "Canoeing: Men's Canadian Pairs 1000 Meters." In The Complete Book of the Olympics: 2008 Edition. London: Aurum Press, Limited. p. 483.

Men's C-2 1000
Men's events at the 1960 Summer Olympics